Seda Mawathe is a 2020 Sri Lankan Sinhala action film directed by Harsha Udakanda and co-produced by director himself with Nishantha Jayawardena, Pushpa Silva and lead actor Anuj Ranasinghe for HU Creations and Hiruna Films. It stars Anuj Ranasinghe in lead role with newcomer Harshi Anjumala whereas Cletus Mendis and Damitha Abeyratne made supportive roles.

The media screening of the film was held at the Tharangani Cinema Hall of the National Film Corporation. The screening of the film halted due to prevailing COVID-19 pandemic in Sri Lanka. However, the film halls were reopened from 27 June 2020 and the film was re-released in film theaters.

Plot

Cast
 Anuj Ranasinghe as Pawan Senanayake 
 Harshi Anjumala as Hiruni Hansamali
 Cletus Mendis as CID Chief
 Damitha Abeyratne as Samanthi
 Ananda Athukorala as Mr. Samaranayake
 Thusitha Danushka as Shirash Ahamed
 Ryan Van Royan as Mohammad Azim
 Rajitha Hiran as Waiter
 Oshadhi Himasha in cameo appearance
 Sudesh Wasantha Peiris as Muslim leader
 Nilu Manasa 
 Menaka Arumapura
 Mahinda Ihalagama
 Gayan Kanchana
 Manjula Senanayake
 Pabasara Sulochana
 Priyantha Muthukudaarachchi
 Yasodha Gunaratne
 Dilani Gunaratne

Soundtrack
The film consists with two songs.

References

External links
 
 Trailer of Seda Mawathe on YouTube

2020 films
2020s Sinhala-language films